Veľká Čausa is a village and municipality in Prievidza District in the Trenčín Region of western Slovakia.

History
In historical records the village was first mentioned in 1430.

Geography
The municipality lies at an altitude of 320 metres and covers an area of 7.814 km². It has a population of about 440 people.

External links
 https://web.archive.org/web/20080111223415/http://www.statistics.sk/mosmis/eng/run.html 

Villages and municipalities in Prievidza District